Thaddeus Holownia  (born July 2, 1949) is a British-born Canadian artist and professor. He taught photography at Mount Allison University and served as the head of the Fine Arts Department, retiring in 2018.

Career
Born in England, the family of Thaddeus Holownia immigrated to Canada when he was five. He attended the University of Windsor, studying printmaking and communications and graduated in 1972. Initially, part of Toronto’s art scene, he began working at the National Film Board of Canada, and joined the faculty of the Mount Allison University Fine Arts Department in 1977.

Art Work
In Holownia’s large-scale photographs, he uses the idea of heightened perception to explore the traces humankind leaves on the landscape. About his work, he echoes Thoreau’s observation, “It’s not what you look at that matters, it’s what you see”. 
 
His photographs have been the subject of numerous exhibitions, including a forty-year retrospective, The Nature of Nature, The Photographs of Thaddeus Holownia 1976–2016, at the Art Gallery of Nova Scotia; The Terra Nova Suite, a 25 year survey of his work in Newfoundland & Labrador at the Provincial Gallery (The Rooms) in St. John's, Newfoundland; 24 Tree Studies for Henry David Thoreau at the Beaverbrook Art Gallery in Fredericton, New Brunswick, and the Heckscher Museum in Huntington, New York. His 1998 retrospective exhibition, Extended Vision: Photographs by Thaddeus Holownia 1978–1997, organized by the Canadian Museum of Contemporary Photography, traveled across Canada and to the Centro de la Imagen in Mexico City. His photographs have been included in numerous group exhibitions, including Monet’s Legacy: Series, Order and Obsession at the Hamburger Kunsthalle, Hamburg, Germany, and Car Culture  at the Heckscher Museum in Huntington, New York.

Holownia`s photographs are in public collections such as the National Gallery of Canada, Ottawa and many eastern Canadian galleries, such as the Art Gallery of Nova Scotia, Halifax (27 works).

Honours
In 2000, Holownia was elected to the Royal Canadian Academy of Arts and in 2001, he received a Fulbright Fellowship. Holownia has been the recipient of grants and awards from the Canada Council for the Arts, the Ontario Arts Council, the American Institute of Graphic Arts, the Royal Canadian Academy of Arts, and the Social Sciences and Humanities Research Council. In 2015, he was named to the Order of New Brunswick. In 2018, he was inducted into the Royal Society of Canada.

Thaddeus Holownia now lives in Jolicure, New Brunswick.

References

Bibliography

External links
 Official website

Canadian photographers
1949 births
Living people
Members of the Royal Canadian Academy of Arts
University of Windsor alumni
Academic staff of Mount Allison University
English emigrants to Canada